Valeriu Munteanu may refer to:

 Valeriu Munteanu (philologist) (1921–1999), Romanian philologist, lexicographer, and translator
 Valeriu Munteanu (politician) (born 1980), Moldovan politician